Into Oblivion is the second studio album by Belgian hardcore punk band Rise and Fall. It features artwork from Jacob Bannon of the Converge fame.

Track listing 
US and European versions
 "Forked Tongues" – 2:30
 "Failure Is as failure Does" – 2:13
 "The Noose" – 3:24
 "Live in Sin" – 1:49
 "The Void" – 2:25
 "Into Oblivion" – 2:36
 "Stakes Is High" – 2:44
 "To Hell and Back" – 2:32
 "Lost Among the Lost" – 2:51
 "Ruins" – 5:37

Japanese bonus tracks
 "Kingdom Of Heaven" (Integrity cover)
 "When They Come Down" (live)
 "Hellmouth" (live)

Personnel 
Production
Recorded in July 2005 by Vincent Tetaert at CCR Studios in Zulte, Belgium.
Mixed in September 2005 by Kurt Ballou (Converge) at Godcity in Boston, MA, USA.
Mastered in October 2005 by Vincent Tetaert at Electric City, Brussels, Belgium.

Release history 

A limited LP version of 2000 copies was released by Reflections Records in February 2006.

References

External links 

 
 Rise and Fall's myspace page
 Deathwish Inc.
 Reflections Records
 Alliance Trax Records

2005 albums
Deathwish Inc. albums
Rise and Fall (band) albums
Albums produced by Kurt Ballou
Albums with cover art by Jacob Bannon